Roberto de Oliveira may refer to:

 Roberto de Oliveira (footballer) (born 1980), Brazilian footballer
 Roberto de Oliveira (soccer) (born 1955), American soccer player